Allotropa is a genus of parasitoid wasp in the family Platygastridae. The genus has an almost cosmopolitan distribution.

Species

References

Platygastridae
Hymenoptera genera